Ajax de Ouenzé is a Congolese football club based in Ouenzé, Brazzaville, that plays in the Congo Premier League.

Honours
Congo Premier League: 0

Coupe du Congo: 0

Super Coupe du Congo: 0

References

External links
Confederation of African Football

Football clubs in the Republic of the Congo
Sports clubs in Brazzaville